Ertan is a Turkish masculine given name. The meaning of the Turkish name is “sunrise”, “dawn” or “early morning hour”. It may refer to:

Given name 
 Ertan Adatepe (born 1938), Turkish footballer
 Ertan Demiri (born 1979), Macedonian football player
 Ertan Irizik (born 1964), Turkish-Swiss footballer 
 Ertan Tombak (born 1999), Bulgarian footballer of Turkish descent
 Ertan Uyanık (born 1979), Turkish-Austrian futsal player

Surname
 Deniz Ertan (born 2004), Turkish female swimmer
 Mustafa Ertan (1926–2005), Turkish footballer
 Semra Ertan (1956–1982), Turkish migrant worker and writer in Germany

See also 
 Ertan Dam, an arch dam on the Yalong River in southwest China

Turkish masculine given names